Ciclova Română is a commune in Caraș-Severin County, western Romania with a population of 1,814 people. It is composed of three villages: Ciclova Română, Ilidia (Illyéd) and Socolari (Szakalár).

References

Communes in Caraș-Severin County
Localities in Romanian Banat
Mining communities in Romania